The Embraer C-390 Millennium is a medium-size, twin-engine, jet-powered military transport aircraft designed and produced by the Brazilian aerospace manufacturer Embraer. It is the heaviest aircraft the company has constructed to date.

Work on the project began at Embraer during the mid-2000s, with early efforts centred around a conceptual derivative of the E190 jetliner of a similar size to the Lockheed C-130 Hercules. The company was keen to use pure jet propulsion, instead of turboprops. Support for the venture was forthcoming from both the Brazilian Government and the Brazilian Air Force; in May 2008, the government invested R$800 million (US$440M) in the project's development. On 14 April 2009, Embraer was issued a $1.5 billion contract for two prototypes. At the 2011 Paris Air Show, Embraer announced plans to launch a stretched version of the aircraft as a civilian freighter. Partnerships were promptly formed with various other aerospace companies on the programme, including ENAER, OGMA, and Boeing. A joint venture with Boeing was announced in November 2019, but was quickly fell apart within six months. Major subcontractors in the aircraft's manufacturing include Aero Vodochody, BAE Systems, and Rockwell Collins.

On 3February 2015, the first of two prototypes performed its maiden flight. On 4September 2019, the first production aircraft was delivered to the Brazilian Air Force. On 18 November 2019, during the Dubai Airshow, Embraer announced the aircraft's new name for the global market, C-390 Millennium. Several export customers for the C-390 have been secured, including the Portuguese Air Force, Hungarian Air Force, and the Royal Netherlands Air Force.

Development

Studies
In the early 2000s, the Brazilian aircraft manufacturer became interested in developing its own medium-sized transport aircraft; its initial design study was based around a high-wing derivative of its existing E190 jetliner. Between 2005 and 2007, it investigated the pairing of the wing and GE CF34 engine of the mature Embraer 190 (E190) with a cabin that was modified to function as a cargo hold, complete with a rear ramp, closed-loop fly-by-wire system, and synthetic vision.

By 2006, Embraer was studying a military tactical transport design of a similar size to the Lockheed C-130 Hercules, which was to be powered by 17,000–22,000 lbf (75.6–98 kN) jet engines, such as the Pratt & Whitney PW6000 and Rolls-Royce BR715. In April 2007, Embraer publicly stated that it was studying a medium-size airlifter. Referred to by the company designation C-390, this transport aircraft was said to incorporate many of the technological solutions present on the Embraer E-Jet series and feature a rear ramp for the loading and unloading of a wide range of cargo.

In March 2008, the Brazilian Government planned to invest about R$60 million (equivalent to ) in the aircraft's initial development; simultaneously, the Brazilian Air Force was in the process of finalizing an initial purchase contract for between 22 to 30 aircraft, while Embraer was negotiating with possible partners on the programme. Two months later, the Brazilian Congress released R$800 million (US$440M) to be invested in the project and fund the aircraft's development. Around this time, the media claimed that the aircraft would be operated not only by the Brazilian Air Force, but also by the Army and Navy as well, and that there were unconfirmed sales to other government agencies in the works.

Program launch

On 14 April 2009, Embraer was awarded with a $1.5 billion contract to develop and build two prototypes. At the programme launch, the design was all-new in terms of its fuselage, wing, flight deck, and engine selection; accordingly, the E-190's wing had been dispensed with, partly due to its limited surface area; it was also stated that the aircraft would be the operational successor to the Brazilian Air Force's C-130 fleet. According to Embraer, the selected jet engine is sufficiently resilient to dust ingestion, whereas propeller tips close to the ground are susceptible to damage. Embraer also chose the IAE V2500 engine for its efficiency under normal conditions, rather than prioritising its performance under unusual conditions, such as on the Antonov An-32.

In March 2010, Embraer drew up a development schedule, upon which the first prototype aircraft was scheduled to be delivered in late 2014. At the 2011 Paris Air Show, Embraer announced plans to launch a stretched version of the C-390 focused on the civil market for freighters sometime around 2018; it estimated that the company would receive 200–250 orders over a 10-year period. To increase internal capacity, two plugs will be added fore and aft of the centre fuselage section, which would also provide a new side cargo door.

In April 2011, Embraer estimated 695 military transport aircraft will need to be replaced in the following decade.

Partnerships
On 24 August 2010, the defence ministers of Chile and Brazil signed an agreement for the Chilean aircraft company ENAER to join the C-390 industry team. That same month, Argentine Defence Minister Nilda Garré announced that Argentina would also participate in the construction programme. In September 2010, Colombia also signed an agreement to participate in the C-390 programme. On 10 September 2010, the defense minister of Portugal signed an intentions letter to join the programme. On 14 December 2011, Brazil and Portugal agreed to a defense partnership with Empresa de Engenharia Aeronáutica (EEA) for developing the engineering data for the KC-390’s components, which will be manufactured by Embraer's Portuguese subsidiary OGMA.

In April 2012, the American aerospace giant Boeing and Embraer signed a cooperation agreement. Two months later, a agreement was signed by the two companies to collaborate on the development of the C-390, and possibly extending to sales as well. In June 2013, Boeing agreed to market the C-390 in the US, UK, and Middle East, building on the June 2012 MoU. On 18 November 2019, it was announced that Boeing and Embraer were to form a new joint venture company to promote and develop new markets for the C-390 Millennium. This new company, Boeing Embraer – Defense, was to have its ownership divided between a 51% stake held by Embraer and 4% by Boeing; it was to commenced operations following the granting of regulatory approvals and the satisfaction of closing conditions. However, on 24 April 2020, it was announced that Boeing had chose to terminate the planned joint ventures with Embraer.

Major subcontractors include Aero Vodochody for the rear fuselage section, BAE Systems for the fly-by-wire primary flight control system, ELEB for the landing gear, OGMA, involved in the design and manufacturing of the sponsons, including the central fuselage, and development of the landing gear, rear wing elevators, fuselage and part of the rudder with CEiiA, with Rockwell Collins for the avionics, cargo handling and aerial delivery system. International Aero Engines (IAE) supplies the V2500-E5 turbofans, its use on the C-390 is its first military application. Fábrica Argentina de Aviones supplies the tail cone, cargo door and landing gear doors.

Flight testing

It was decided to construct a pair of prototypes to participate in the test programme. On 21 October 2014, the first prototype (PT-ZNF) rolled out from the Embraer subsidiary plant, Embraer Defense and Security, at Gavião Peixoto, São Paulo. On 3February 2015, the first prototype performed its maiden flight.

In July 2015, the company announced a two-year delay in the flight test program, citing the devaluation of the Brazilian currency and government spending cuts. However, a second test flight took place at Gavião Peixoto on 26 October 2015. By February 2016, the first prototype had logged more than 100 hours of flight. Following the resumption of flight-testing, the manufacturer expected to certify the C-390 sometime in 2017 and begin deliveries in 2018. The eight months between test flights were used to conduct ground vibration tests to validate aeroelastic models, as well as avionics, mission, landing gear and electric and hydraulic flight control system testing. Embraer reported good availability for testing, sometimes conducting two flights per day. The aircraft was tested to the limits of speed, Mach number, and altitude, as well as all slats, flaps and landing gear positions.

In March 2016, the second prototype (PT-ZNJ) was completed; it conducted its first flight on 28 April 2016. By then, Richard Aboulafia's Teal Group estimated the C-390's price to be around $50–55 million, which was $15 million below that of the competing Hercules.

On 17 October 2017, the first prototype (PT-ZNF) made an uncommanded descent from 20000 ft to 3100 ft at 4500 ft/min. In December 2017, as the two prototypes accumulated over 1,500 flight hours and laboratory testing over 40,000 hours, initial operating capability was reached while full operational capability was expected in 2018. On 5May 2018, the first prototype (PT-ZNF) ran off the runway during a ground test in Gaviao Peixoto, Brazil. The first production C-390, which was the third aircraft to be built including the prototypes, made its first flight on 6October 2018.

On 23 October 2018, the C-390 was issued with Brazilian civil type certification; by this point, the aircraft has cumulatively attained 1,900 flight hours during testing, while the first production aircraft was set to be delivered to the Brazilian Air Force in the first half of 2019 and should obtain military certification by the end of 2019. The third aircraft (PT-ZNG), originally slated for the first delivery, was instead redirected towards the certification efforts.

In February 2021, Embraer and the Brazilian Air Force dispatched a single KC-390 to the US to undergo testing under extreme cold conditions.

Design

The Embraer C-390 Millennium is a mid-sized utility transport aircraft. Its design permits flexible operations; both the internal and external configuration of the aircraft can be rapidly interchanged to accommodate different mission roles. It also incorporates modern technology and mission software to aid crews in carrying out operations. The cockpit has head-up displays for the enhanced vision system with four cameras and Rockwell Collins Pro Line Fusion commercial avionics.

The aircraft is powered by a pair of IAE V2500-E5 turbofan engines, which are mounted forward on the high wing; this wing features an anhedral angle, slats, and High-lift devices able to deflect up to 40°. The landing gear is equipped with low-pressure tires, two  on the nose and four  on either side bogies, which facilitate the aircraft's use upon soft, unpaved ground, such as austere airstrips, or damaged runways. The C-390 has a cruising speed of Mach 0.8 which, according to Embraer, enables payloads to be transported faster than any other airplane in the medium airlift market. When its flaps are fully deployed at 40 degrees, it has a stall speed of  IAS.

The aircraft is equipped with fully fly-by-wire flight controls combined with active sidesticks, which reduces the crew's workload over conventional counterparts and permits load factors up to 3g. An autothrottle system is also installed. The navigation systems, which were largely supplied by Thales Group, include an Inertial Navigation System (INS), GPS, and Collision Avoidance System (TCAS) transponder. It is fitted with SELEX Galileo's Gabbiano tactical radar, capable of GMTI, SAR, ISAR, SART modes amongst others. For self-defense purposes, an Elbit Systems-supplied directional infrared countermeasures suite is also typically installed. An integrated onboard maintenance system actively monitors the health of the overall aircraft and various subsystems at all times.

A cargo handling and aerial delivery system, produced by DRS Defense Solutions, is incorporated. Typical amenities present in the hold include a galley, an accessibility-friendly toilet, automatic temperature control, and noise/vibration mitigation measures; Embraer have stated that the considerable attention was paid to passenger comfort.

Operational history

Brazil

In 2014, the Government of Brazil ordered 28 C-390s; there was the stated intention of progressively replacing the Brazilian Air Force's existing cargo aircraft fleet with the type, including its C-130s. The first C-390 was officially delivered to the Brazilian Air Force on 4 September 2019. The fleet of C-390s will be operated from Anápolis Air Force Base by the 1st Troop Transportation Group (1º GTT) Zeus and in Rio de Janeiro by the 1st/1st GT Gordo.

In January 2021, in the middle of the second wave of the COVID-19 pandemic, the Brazilian city of Manaus, located in the interior of the Amazon rainforest, was left with an overburdened medical service needing medical supplies and help with transferring patients. A major operation was set up by the Brazilian air force, mobilizing all its available transport aviation. The C-390 played a key role in this operation, carrying out an airlift mission connecting the city of Manaus to the rest of the country, taking hospital supplies and removing hundreds of patients from an overloaded Manaus.

Following the 2020 Beirut explosion, a C-390 and an Embraer 190 VC-2 were sent with around six tons of medicines, food and health equipment to provide emergency care. It was the first international mission of the aircraft in FAB service.

In February 2021, during Operational Exercise “Culminating”, in Louisiana, United States, the KC-390 conducted joint flights with US Air Force C-17 and C-130 airlifters. At that time, the combined force launched 4,000 paratroopers in a single night jump. In the same year, after the Haiti earthquake, the C-390 was dispatched to the country with around eleven tons of medicine and specialized firefighting equipment for search and rescue in collapsed structures, search dogs and doctors.

A single C-390 flew to Ushuaia carrying spare parts in support of a FAB C-130 that was on an Antarctic operation. In the Russian-Ukrainian conflict of 2022, a KC-390 and a VC-99B Legacy were sent with a mission to rescue Brazilian nationals and other countries, the mission also brought a total of around 12 tons of humanitarian aid to Ukraine. The mission rescued national, Ukrainian, Argentine and Colombian citizens, all of whom were taken to Brazil.

In February 2022, the Brazilian Government and Embraer agreed to downsize the former's order for C-390s to 22, which was a reduction from the original order for 28 aircraft. This measure, which was taken as a financial austerity measure due to COVID-19, was less severe than early suggestions for as few as 15. At this point, four C-390s were in FAB service.

As of June 2022, a C-390 from the Fat Squadron (1st/1st GT) of the FAB participated for the first time in the Brazilian Antarctic Campaign, dropping supply loads for the Comandante Ferraz Antarctic Station.

Hungary
On 17 November 2020, almost six months after the Hungarian Air Force had retired its last Soviet-era An-26 military cargo plane, Embraer announced that Hungary had signed an order for two KC-390s, along with full training, support and maintenance. The first aircraft is to be delivered to Hungary in 2023, with the second following in 2024. The configurations that the Hungarian Defence Forces ordered include the Intensive Care Unit (ICU) kit, enabling Hungary to provide intensive care medicine in humanitarian missions abroad.

On 19 November 2021, Embraer started assembly of the first Hungarian KC-390 at its Gavião Peixoto facility.

Netherlands
On 16 June 2022, the Netherlands Ministry of Defense announced in Parliament through State Secretary for Defense Christophe van der Maat that it found a successor to the Royal Netherlands Air Force's (RNLAF) C-130H Hercules, which were becoming increasingly maintenance-hungry due to their advanced age. Instead of being phased out by 2031, their replacement would commence in 2026; as suggested through operational experiences in Kabul in the summer of 2021 and events along NATO's eastern flank in the spring of 2022, an increased need for the transport mission had been identified. Furthermore, the C-390 Millennium was found to surpass the requirements. Instead of the anticipated four aircraft, the RNLAF expects to receive five aircraft from 2026 onwards, allowing annual flight hours to rise from the required 2,400 to 4,000.

Portugal
In February 2010, Embraer proposed the C-390 to the Portuguese Ministry of Defense as a replacement option for the Portuguese Air Force's aging fleet of C-130s. In December 2011, the Portuguese government was reportedly set to sign an €87–million contract with Embraer regarding participation in the production of the C-390.

In July 2017, the Portuguese Government authorized the purchase of five C-390 airlifters, with the option for a sixth. The deal, which includes not only five C-390s but also a flight simulator for pilot training, was reportedly costed at €827 million. The first aircraft was set to be delivered to Portugal in February 2023, while the final C-390 was to be handed over by February 2027.

Marketing and orders
The C-390 has been marketed as a jet-powered alternative to the C-130 Hercules produced by Lockheed Martin. In April 2013, Brazil, Portugal, Hungary, Argentina, Chile, Colombia, and the Czech Republic had signed agreements for a total of 60 C-390s.

In September 2007, Correios, the Brazilian postal service, stated its interest in acquiring five or more aircraft to replace commercial freight service for mail transport. In May 2011, Correios was reportedly planning to buy 15 aircraft from Embraer.

In September 2009, France proposed that it purchase ten C-390s as part of an offset arrangement in regards to the planned sales of Dassault Rafale fighters to Brazil. In October 2009, Sweden was reportedly intending to evaluate the C-390 in connection to its F-X2 offer for the JAS 39 Gripen fighter.

In August 2010, the Chilean Air Force planned to order six C-390s. One month later, Colombia announced its intent to order 12 C-390s. Later that same month, the Czech Air Force expressed a need for two C-390s. That month, the United Arab Emirates was reportedly negotiating an agreement for military cooperation which would involve purchasing several C-390s. 

In October 2010, the Argentine Air Force expressed interest in buying six C-390s. In February 2012, Peru also expressed interest in purchasing the C-390. In August 2013, the Colombian Air Force announced that it would acquire a fleet of C-390s to replace its Lockheed C-130 Hercules fleet.

In February 2018, aviation services company SkyTech signed a letter of intent to buy up to six aircraft.

In October 2019, the President of Ukraine, Volodymyr Zelensky, expressed his country's interest in the C-390 during a meeting with President Jair Bolsonaro.

Operators

 Brazilian Air Force – 19 C-390s ordered, five delivered.
1st Troop Transportation Group Zeus
1st Squadron of the 1st Transportation Group (1°/1°GT) Gordo
 Hungarian Air Force – two C-390s ordered in 2020.
 Royal Netherlands Air Force - five C-390s to be ordered in 2022 to replace its C-130Hs from 2026 onwards.
 Portuguese Air Force – five C-390s ordered in 2019 to replace its C-130s. The first aircraft arrived on October 16, 2022 at Beja Airbase.

Specifications (C-390 Millennium)

Systems and equipment
 RWR / chaff & flare (self-defense systems)
 DIRCM - Directional Infrared Countermeasures (self-defense systems)
 In-flight refueling system
 Dual HUD system
 Cabin lighting compatible with night vision systems
 CCDP - Continuously Computed Drop Point, an automated, accurate drop point calculation system
 CDS - Container Delivery System
 LVAD - Low Velocity Airdrop Delivery
 EEPGS – Emergency Electric Power Generator System (type RAT or Ram Air Turbine)

See also

References

External links

 
 
 
 
 

Embraer aircraft
2010s Brazilian military transport aircraft
High-wing aircraft
T-tail aircraft
Argentina–Brazil relations
Brazil–Portugal relations
Aircraft first flown in 2015
 Twinjets